The Nokia 6730 classic was announced to the public on 29 May 2009. Key features include an integrated A-GPS and 3.15 megapixel camera.

6730